Captain Leslie William Abel Bennington DSO & Bar, DSC & Two Bars (20 February 1912 – 24 June 1981) was a British Royal Navy officer, who was highly decorated for his actions as a submarine commander during the Second World War.

Early life
Bennington was born in the Weymouth district of Dorset, England on 20 February 1912 the son of William Griffin Bennington and his wife Alice Maud.

Military career
Bennington received his commission into the Royal Navy on 1 September 1933. He undertook a promotion course at the Royal Naval College, Greenwich and became a submariner.

He was made a Companion of the Distinguished Service Order on 20 December 1942 for his successful patrols in the Mediterranean as commander of Porpoise, during which seven enemy ships were sunk. On 11 April 1944 Bennington was awarded a Bar to his DSO for the successful attack on the  during the action of 11 January 1944. He also commanded Tally-Ho during the action of 14 February 1944, for which he was awarded a Bar to his DSC on 6 June 1944. On 20 February 1945 he was awarded a second Bar to his DSC for "outstanding courage, skill and undaunted devotion to duty" while in command of HMS Tally-Ho.

Between April 1945 and April 1946 Bennington served with Naval Equipment Department at the Admiralty, before taking command of the cruiser  prior to her sale to the Chinese in May 1948. He then served with various vessels as executive officer, before taking command of the airbase  from 1953 to 1955. Between December 1955 and January 1957 Bennington served as Captain of Dockyard, Deputy Superintendent and Queen's Harbour Master at the Malta Dockyard. He retired on 7 July 1960 with the rank of captain.

Bennington died on 24 June 1981 at Rye, Sussex aged 69.

References

1912 births
1981 deaths
Companions of the Distinguished Service Order
Graduates of the Royal Naval College, Greenwich
Recipients of the Distinguished Service Cross (United Kingdom)
Royal Navy officers of World War II
Royal Navy submarine commanders